Three Bites of the Apple is a 1967 American romantic comedy film directed by Alvin Ganzer.

Plot
Stanley Thrumm is a British tour guide. An unlikely night of successful casino gambling on the Italian Riviera leaves him wealthy but in a quandary. If he returns to England with the cash, most of it will go to British taxes. He decides to smuggle the money to Switzerland and establish a bank account there. Carla Moretti, a beautiful bystander at the casino, volunteers to help, but in fact intends to fleece Thrumm with the help of her ex-husband. As summarized by Michael Betzold, the "lightweight comedy" turns into a "long car chase with many comic diversions and a lot of Alpine scenery".

There also is a soundtrack album where David McCallum sings the theme song over the opening credits.

Cast 

 David McCallum: Stanley Thrumm
 Sylva Koscina: Carla Moretti 
 Tammy Grimes: Angela Sparrow 
 Harvey Korman: Harvey Tomlinson 
 Domenico Modugno: Remo Romano
 Aldo Fabrizi: Dr. Manzoni
 Mirella Maravidi: Francesca Bianchini
 Riccardo Garrone: Croupier
 Avril Angers: Gladys Tomlinson
 Claude Aliotti: Teddy Farnum  
 Freda Bamford: Gussie Hagstrom
 Arthur Hewlett: Alfred Guffy
 Alison Frazer: Peg Farnum
 Cardew Robinson: Bernhard Hagstrom
 Ann Lancaster: Winnifred Batterf

Production notes 
The film is currently available through the Warner Archive Collection.

See also
List of American films of 1968

References

External links

1967 romantic comedy films
American romantic comedy films
Metro-Goldwyn-Mayer films
Films set in Italy
Films set in Switzerland
Films directed by Alvin Ganzer